Kottapalli is a village in Srikakulam district of the Indian state of Andhra Pradesh. It is located in Mandasa mandal, and the Mahendratanaya River flows besides the village.

Demographics
Kottapalli village has population of 954 of which 468 are males while 486 are females as per Population 2011, Indian Census.

References

Villages in Srikakulam district